The 80th 24 Hours of Le Mans (French: 80e 24 Heures du Mans) was an 24-hour automobile endurance race for teams of three drivers each entering Le Mans Prototype and Le Mans Grand Touring Endurance cars held from 16 to 17 June 2012 at the Circuit de la Sarthe close to Le Mans, France before 240,000 spectators. It was the 80th running of the event, as organised by the automotive group, the Automobile Club de l'Ouest (ACO) since 1923. The race was the third round of the 2012 FIA World Endurance Championship, with 30 of the race's 56 entries contesting the championship. A test day was held two weeks prior to the race on 3 June.

A Audi R18 e-tron quattro driven by André Lotterer, Marcel Fässler and Benoît Tréluyer started from pole position after Lotterer set the fastest overall lap time in the third qualifying session. The team were untroubled in the opening hours of the race until a Toyota TS030 Hybrid shared by Alexander Wurz, Kazuki Nakajima and Nicolas Lapierre took the lead. Toyota relinquished it during a safety car period for a major accident at the start of the sixth hour. Audi's other team of Allan McNish, Tom Kristensen and Rinaldo Capello became their teammate's lead challengers until McNish crashed while lapping slower traffic in the 22nd hour and providing Lotterer, Fässler and Tréluyer with a lead they maintained to the end of the race. It was Lotterer, Fässler and Tréluyer's second Le Mans win, Audi's eleventh and the first for a hybrid electric vehicle. The second Audi finished one lap behind in second place and a R18 ultra of Oliver Jarvis, Marco Bonanomi and Mike Rockenfeller completed an Audi sweep of the podium positions in third.

The Le Mans Prototype 2 (LMP2) class was won by the Starworks Motorsport team of Enzo Potolicchio, Ryan Dalziel and Tom Kimber-Smith in a HPD ARX-03b after they led the final 215 laps of the event. The trio finished ahead of Thiriet by TDS Racing's Oreca 03 car shared by Pierre Thiriet, Mathias Beche and Christophe Tinseau and Pecom Racing's Luís Pérez Companc, Pierre Kaffer and Soheil Ayari. Giancarlo Fisichella, Gianmaria Bruni and Toni Vilander in an AF Corse Ferrari 458 Italia held a three-lap lead in Le Mans Grand Touring Professional (LMGTE Pro) over Luxury Racing's trio of Frédéric Makowiecki, Jaime Melo and Dominik Farnbacher. The Le Mans Grand Touring Amateur (LMGTE Am) category was won by Larbre Compétition's Chevrolet Corvette C6.R of Patrick Bornhauser, Pedro Lamy and Julien Canal after Lamy overtook Anthony Pons, Nicolas Armindo and Raymond Narac's IMSA Performance Matmut Porsche 997 GT3-RSR in the final hour.

Due to the result of the race, McNish, Kristensen and Capello were elevated to the lead of the Drivers' Championship, 6½ points over the race winners Lotterer, Fässler and Tréluyer in second position. The leaders entering the event, Romain Dumas and Loïc Duval fell to third. Marc Gené was in fourth place and the Rebellion trio of Nick Heidfeld, Neel Jani and Nico Prost completed the top five after finishing in fourth position. Audi continued to lead the non-scoring Toyota in the Manufacturers' Championship with five races left in the season.

Background
The 24 Hours of Le Mans was first held in 1923 after the automotive journalist Charles Faroux, the Automobile Club de l'Ouest (ACO) general secretary Georges Durand and the industrialist Emile Coquile agreed to hold a test of vehicle reliability and durability. The 24 Hours of Le Mans is considered one of the world's most prestigious motor races and is part of the Triple Crown of Motorsport.

The ACO moved the 2012 Le Mans schedule forward by one week in order to avoid a date conflict with races in the 2012 Formula One World Championship and to allow teams to establish their facilities at the Circuit de la Sarthe close to Le Mans, France. It was the 80th annual edition of the event, as well as the third of eight automobile endurance races of the 2012 FIA World Endurance Championship (WEC).

After the preceding 6 Hours of Spa-Francorchamps, Audi drivers Romain Dumas and Loïc Duval led the Drivers' Championship with 43 points, two ahead of their teammates Rinaldo Capello, Tom Kristensen and Allan McNish in second place. Marc Gené was in third position with 25 points, the trio of Marcel Fässler, André Lotterer and Benoît Tréluyer were in fourth place with  points and Timo Bernhard was fifth with 18 points. Audi led the non-scoring Toyota in the Manufacturers' Championship by 52 points.

Regulation changes
With the introduction of hybrid electric vehicles for the first time at the 24 Hours of Le Mans in 2012, the ACO and the world governing body of motor racing, the Fédération Internationale de l'Automobile (FIA), created seven zones on the Circuit de la Sarthe for those cars to recuperate electrical energy under braking. Each zone was situated  before the entry to a corner.

Entries

Automatic entries

Automatic entries were earned by teams which won their class in the 2011 24 Hours of Le Mans. Teams who won Le Mans-based series and events such as the American Le Mans Series (ALMS), Le Mans Series (LMS), and the Petit Le Mans were also invited. Some second-place finishers were also granted automatic entries in certain series. Entries were also granted for the winners of the Michelin Energy Endurance Challenge in both the ALMS and the LMS. A final entry was granted to the champion in the LMS' Formula Le Mans category, and the winner received their invitation in Le Mans Prototype 2 (LMP2). As automatic entries were granted to teams, teams were allowed to change their cars from the previous year to the next, but not their category. Automatic invitations in the two GTE categories could be swapped between the two based on the driver line-ups chosen by those teams. As the ALMS did not separate between the Pro and Am categories, only a single GTE invitation was granted for their class champion.

On 24 November 2011, the list of automatic entries was announced by the ACO. Peugeot Sport chose not to accept their automatic invitation as they withdrew from sports car racing in January 2012 due to financial difficulties. BMW Team RLL and Pegasus Racing were the other two teams who did not take up their entries because both teams elected to focus on their respective series during the 2012 season.

Entry list
In conjunction with the announcement of entries for the 2012 FIA WEC, the ACO announced the full 56-car entry list and nine-vehicle reserve list at a press conference in Paris on 2 February. In addition to the 30 guaranteed entries from the WEC, 5 came from the ALMS, 3 from the LMS, while the rest of the field was filled with one-off entries only competing at Le Mans.

Garage 56

For the 56th and final entry for the 2012 Le Mans race, the ACO promoted cars which featured advancements in technology, either for performance or ecological improvement. Three projects were submitted to the ACO, with the automatic entry being granted to an American group by the name of Project 56 who developed the DeltaWing concept originally proposed for the American IndyCar Series. The extremely lightweight car features a layout that is far removed from the style of Le Mans Prototypes. The project was backed by Highcroft Racing, All American Racers and the Panoz Group. Two other entries had been granted reserve status if the DeltaWing team withdrew: the Swiss-developed GreenGT LMP-H2, which utilized a hydrogen fuel cell to run electric motors within a Le Mans Prototype style body, and the French Courage 0.12 used stored energy to drive electric motors.

Reserves
Nine reserves were initially nominated by the ACO, limited to the LMP2 (five) and both of the LMGTE (four) categories. The Dyson Racing teams withdrew both of their Lola B12/60-Mazda cars from the entry list on 16 April, citing a financial difficulty preventing the team from obtaining the necessary budget to compete at Le Mans and a desire to focus on the ALMS. This promoted the  30 Status Grand Prix Lola B12/80 and the No. 48 Murphy Prototypes Oreca 03-Nissan cars to the race entry list. That same day, the ACO released a revised entry list confirming the withdrawal of the Dyson entries as well as the Jetalliance, Hope Racing, Lotus Cars and Aston Martin Racing reserve entries. By the event's start, three reserved entries had not been promoted to the race entry.

Testing and practice
A test day was held on 3 June, two weeks prior to the race, and required all race entrants to participate in eight hours of track time divided into two sessions. A second Level 5 Motorsports HPD ARX-03b for Scott Tucker, the No. 32 Lotus Lola B12/80 and IMSA Performance's Porsche 997 GT3-RSR reserve entries took part. Sébastien Loeb Racing and two DAMS-entered Le Mans Prototype Challenge Oreca-FLM09s also participated. Toyota's Stéphane Sarrazin was unable to take part in testing after sustaining facial injuries from a bike accident on the afternoon of 2 June.

Duval set the fastest lap in the first session at 3 minutes, 27.738 seconds in the No. 3 Audi R18 Ultra. McNish later improved to a 3 minutes, 25.927 seconds lap in the No. 2 Audi R18 e-tron quattro though he crashed at Tertre Rouge corner with one hour remaining and was unable to continue. He was followed by Lotterer's No. 1 Audi in second and Duval fell to third. The fastest Toyota TS030 Hybrid was fourth courtesy of a lap from Alexander Wurz and the fastest privateer LMP1 entry was Danny Watts' No. 21 Strakka Racing HPD ARX-03a car in sixth. At the end of the first session, Guillaume Moreau crashed the No. 15 OAK Racing Pescarolo car heavily against a concrete barrier in the Porsche Curves, sustaining a fracture to the T12 vertebrae on his spinal cord. He underwent an operation at the Centre Hospitalier Universitaire d'Angers to reduce the pressure on his spinal cord and was ruled out of the race. His place was taken by former Peugeot driver Franck Montagny. Olivier Pla's OAK Morgan LMP2 car led in LMP2 as Frédéric Makowiecki in the No. 59 Luxury Racing Ferrari 458 Italia GT2 was the fastest driver in LMGTE Pro and Allan Simonsen helped Aston Martin to be fastest in LMGTE Am. Separate crashes from Piergiuseppe Perazzini, Rui Águas, Jordan Taylor, Pierre Thiriet and Gianmaria Bruni led to disruptions during the second session.

After the test several prototype teams, including all Audi, Toyota, Pescarolo and Starworks Motorsports cars participated in an unofficial test on the shorter Bugatti Circuit on 6 June to ensure car components were working efficiently before the race. Official practice was held on 13 June with the full 56-car field on track for four hours. Audi led from the start once again, with Duval and later Tréluyer setting the early pace. Kristensen went faster before a lap of 3 minutes, 25.163 seconds from Lotterer at the end of the session made him quickest and Audi took the first four places. Kazuki Nakajima was the fastest Toyota driver in fifth and his teammate Anthony Davidson was sixth. A powertrain issue stopped the No. 8 Toyota on the Mulsanne Straight and it required an engine change. Watts was the fastest LMP1 privateer in seventh and Sébastien Bourdais's No. 17 Pescarolo Dome-Judd placed eighth. Tom Kimber-Smith in the No. 44 Starworks HPD ARX-03b vehicle led in LMP2 with a 3 minutes, 39.669 seconds lap, ahead of the No. 38 Jota Zytek Z11SN car of Sam Hancock and Warren Hughes' No. 48 Murphy Prototypes Oreca entry. The LMGTE Pro category was led by the No. 97 Aston Martin of Darren Turner with a time of 3 minutes, 57.036 seconds and Patrick Pilet in the No. 79 Flying Lizard Porsche was fastest in LMGTE Am and was within 1.2 seconds of Turner's pace. The No. 51 AF Corse Ferrari caused a stoppage after Giancarlo Fisichella pirouetted and heavily damaged the car's rear-left corner in the Porsche Curves. The ACO and the FIA applied force majeure and allowed the car's chassis to be transported to AF Corse's factory in Piacenza for reconstruction.

Qualifying
The first of three two-hour qualifying sessions began late 13 June night under clear conditions. Audi led from the first minutes of the session with a flying lap from Oliver Jarvis in the No. 4 Audi, followed by Kristensen overtaking Jarvis soon after. He was followed by Lotterer whose final timed lap of 3 minutes, 25.453 seconds earned the No. 1 Audi team provisional pole position. Kristensen's time put the No. 2 car second and Duval's No. 3 entry finished the session third. The No. 7 Toyota of Nicolas Lapierre was 1.7 seconds adrift of the fastest Audi in fourth. Mike Rockenfeller's No. 4 Audi took fifth and Davidson's No. 8 Toyota in sixth was the slowest of all the hybrid cars. Watts, driving the No. 21 Strakka HPD, was the top non-hybrid LMP1 vehicle in seventh. Mathias Beche drove the No. 46 Thiriet by TDS Oreca to provisional pole in LMP2 with a lap of 3 minutes, 39.252 seconds ahead of the Murphy Oreca car of Brendon Hartley and Kimber-Smith's Starworks HPD vehicle. Keiko Ihara crashed the No. 29 Gulf Racing Middle East Lola car at the Dunlop Curves and was extricated from a barrier by recovery vehicles. The Pro class of LMGTE had Chevrolet lead from the start with the fastest lap set by Oliver Gavin in the No. 74 C6.R at 3 minutes, 55.910 seconds. Ferrari, Aston Martin and Porsche all had cars within two seconds of the Corvette. Pilet's Flying Lizard Porsche set the pace in LMGTE Am, followed by Sean Edwards' No. 75 Prospeed Competition car and Simonsen's Aston Martin. The experimental DeltaWing car driven by Michael Krumm suffered a heavy jolt on a kerb that activated its onboard fire extinguisher and the master electrical switch, disabling the engine.

The weather was clear for the second session on the evening of 14 June. Duval's Audi R18 Ultra was quickest in the session with a lap of 3 minutes, 24.098 seconds on 30 minutes to go and passed Lotterer's No. 1 Audi for provisional pole position. McNish's No. 2 car finished the session third at the conclusion of a final six-lap stint as Davidson prevented Audi from taking the first four positions in the No. 8 Toyota. The No. 4 Audi of Marco Bonanomi fell to fifth and Toyota's No. 7 entry driven by Nakajima dropped to sixth after Lapierre lost control of its rear and spun into some grass entering the Ford Chicane. Watts' Strakka HPD improved its best lap to ensure it remained the fastest non-hybrid LMP1 vehicle in seventh with Neel Jani's No. 12 Rebellion Lola-Toyota eighth. One second covered the first six vehicles in LMP2 as Pla gave OAK's Oreca car provisional pole in class at the session's conclusion with a time of 3 minutes, 38.598 seconds despite a driver error into a gravel trap at Indianapolis corner. Nelson Panciatici's No. 26 Signatech car was second. In LMGTE Pro, Makowiecki moved the No. 59 Luxury Ferrari to the provisional category pole position. Turner helped Aston Martin to finish the session second and Tommy Milner's No. 74 Corvette took third. The No. 58 Luxury Ferrari was the fastest LMGTE Am car of the session yet it was more than 1.2 seconds behind the Flying Lizard Porsche's pole lap.

In the third session, Lotterer in the No. 1 R18 e-tron quattro set a new fastest lap of 3 minutes, 23.787 seconds after 13 minutes and held the top of the time sheets to take pole position for Audi. Audi was the first manufacturer to earn pole position with a hybrid electric vehicle at Le Mans and took its seventh overall pole at the race. Duval improved the No. 3 Audi's lap to sit alongside the No. 1 car on the grid's front row. The No. 8 Toyota of Davidson closed to almost within a second of the pole sitting Audi with 15 minutes remaining to take third position. Kristensen separated the two Toyota entries in fourth place as Nakajima qualified the No. 7 TS030 Hybrid fifth. The final manufacturer vehicle was Jarvis' No. 4 Audi in sixth. Watts' Strakka won against the Rebellion car of Jani to be the fastest non-hybrid LMP1 car in seventh. Seiji Ara in the No. 17 Pescarolo Dome car made impact with a barrier at the Porsche Curves and brought out the sole stoppage of 10 minutes in all three sessions. In LMP2, John Martin's No. 26 ADR-Delta Oreca vehicle set a time of 3 minutes, 38.181 seconds in the first minutes of the session to move the team to pole position and its lap was unchallenged thereafter. Pla's OAK Oreca car fell to second and Panciatici's Signatech vehicle started from third after an error during the session. The No. 97 Aston Martin of Turner was unable to better the car's time to displace Makowiecki's No. 59 Luxury Racing Ferrari at the top of LMGTE Pro and Milner's No. 74 Corvette remained third in category. The lead in LMGTE Am remained with the Flying Lizard Porsche, 0.012 seconds ahead of the No. 77 Team Felbermayr-Proton Pro category car.

Qualifying results
Pole position winners in each class are indicated in bold. The fastest time set by each entry is denoted in gray.

Notes:
 —The No. 16 Pescarolo 03-Judd started from the pit lane after a change of engine overran into the race.

Warm-up

The cars took to the circuit on the morning of 16 June for a 45-minute warm-up session on a waterlogged track. The No. 3 Audi driven by Duval set the fastest lap of 4 minutes, 3.933 seconds with the sister No. 2 car of Capello second and the pole sitting No. 1 of Lotterer third. Jarvis' No. 4 Audi was fourth and the quickest Toyota was fifth after a lap from Wurz. The fastest LMP2 lap was recorded by the No. 42 Greaves Motorsport Zytek Nissan car of Lucas Ordóñez. AF Corse's No. 51 Ferrari driven by Toni Vilander was the fastest car in LMGTE Pro while Joël Camathias of JWA-Avila helped Porsche to lead in LMGTE Am. During the session, where several cars aquaplaned on the track, Marc Rostan spun the No. 29 Gulf Racing Middle East Lola car on the start/finish straight and Jan Charouz beached the No. 25 ADR-Delta Oreca vehicle in a gravel trap at Dunlop Curve leading to the session being stopped for ten minutes.

Race

Start
Approximately 240,000 spectators attended the race. The French tricolour was waved at 15:00 Central European Summer Time (UTC+02:00), by Takeshi Uchiyamada, the vice president and director of Toyota, to start the race, led by the starting pole sitter Lotterer. A total of 56 cars planned to take the start but the No. 16 Pescarolo 03-Judd car underwent an engine change in the pit lane after it failed during the warm-up session and the No. 21 Strakka HPD vehicle had a gearbox oil leak caused by a seal connecting the driveshaft and the gearbox failing. Lotterer maintained his lead on the opening lap and he pulled away from the rest of the field. McNish's No. 2 Audi overtook Sarrazin's No. 8 Toyota for third and he held off a counter-challenge from Sarrazin to keep the position. Light rain that fell on the north section of the track did not affect the race.

In LMP2, John Martin led the first nine laps until Pla's OAK car passed him during pit stop rotation. The No. 59 Luxury Racing Ferrari of Jaime Melo fell to fifth in the opening laps as LMGTE Am began as a multi-car battle between representatives of Porsche, Ferrari and Aston Martin with the lead of the class changing multiple times during the first hour. The LMGTE classes continued to be closely contested in the second hour with the No. 97 Aston Martin of Stefan Mücke, AF Corse's No. 51 Ferrari of Bruni and Gavin's No. 74 Corvette duelling for the head of the Pro category. Kimber-Smith was lapping faster than Soheil Ayari's No. 49 Pecom vehicle in the LMP2 category at the time and he moved the Starworks team to second in class. The hour had the first retirement with Rostan's No. 29 Gulf Racing Middle East Lola car sustaining a broken front-left wheel alignment from an accident leaving the Porsche Curves. Pilet and later Spencer Pumpelly's No. 79 Flying Lizard car took a clear lead in LMGTE Am after the No. 99 Aston Martin of Simonsen developed a misfire. LMGTE Pro continued to be a close battle between Milner's No. 74 Corvette, Turner's No. 97 Aston Martin and Bruni's No. 51 AF Corse Ferrari with the three cars nose-to-tail on the circuit and the lead changed frequently. The Ferrari was subsequently able to remain on track for longer than its competitors during a sequence of pit stops.

Nearly four hours into the race, Kristensen's No. 2 Audi returned to the garage so that the team's mechanics could remove a large amount of rubber debris lodged in its right-rear suspension arm and created a vibration. Kristensen returned to the race in fifth position and a routine pit stop for Duval's No. 3 car promoted the Toyota cars of Lapierre and Buemi to second and third. Although Toyota had less fuel economy than Audi, Buemi and later his teammate Lapierre were able to attack in the fourth hour and lowered Tréluyer's lead to twenty seconds. Jody Firth in the No. 48 Murphy Prototypes Oreca-Nissan vehicle passed Ryan Dalziel's Starworks HPD car for third in LMP2 and he pulled away from Dalziel to lead him by twenty seconds. Lapierre sustained damage to the No. 7 Toyota's right rear wing endplate which later detached and he continued in second position. Not long after Dumas was lapping the LMGTE-Am leading No. 79 Flying Lizard Porsche of Seth Neiman at the first Mulsanne Straight chicane and he understeered heavily into a tyre barrier with the No. 4 Audi's front-right corner. The car sustained heavy damage to its front bodywork, and required a 26-minute and 34-second pit stop to replace it and dropping the car down the race order. The fifth hour ended with Lapierre prevailing against Tréluyer in a duel for the lead.

Evening to night

At the start of the sixth hour Davidson in third was lapping Perazzini's No. 81 AF Corse Ferrari when the left-rear of the No. 8 Toyota made contact with the front-right of the Ferrari at the end of the Mulsanne Straight. The Toyota rotated through 360 degrees, lifted into the air after its right-rear wheel detached in the collision with the Ferrari and allowed air to penetrate its floor, It struck the tarmac with its front-left corner and hurtled upright at high speed towards a tyre wall at Mulsanne corner. Perrazzini's Ferrari made heavy side contact with an armco metal barrier that deformed it and the vehicle was turned onto its roof. The safety cars were deployed to slow the race as marshals worked for 70 minutes to replace and repair the damaged barriers and extricate the two cars from the track. Both Davidson and Perrazzini vacated their vehicles without external assistance; Davidson was transported to a local hospital from the circuit's medical centre complaining of shock and back pain. Davidson fractured his T11 and T12 vertebrae while Perrazzini was unhurt.

Half a minute after racing resumed the overall leading No. 1 Audi of Fässler was delayed by slower traffic, causing Nakajima's No. 7 Toyota to collide with the left-hand corner of the No. 0 DeltaWing car of Satoshi Motoyama and sent the latter into a concrete barrier beside the circuit. The DeltaWing sustained damage to its steering arm, powertrain and rear bodywork; track marshals pushed it behind the wall to allow mechanics from Highcroft Racing to advise Motoyama on how to repair the car. He spent 90 minutes repairing the car with garage equipment though he was unable to make it mobile and retired. Brendon Hartley was the fastest LMP2 driver at the time and he brought the No. 48 Greaves Oreca to the lead of the category. The No. 7 Toyota was driven into the pit lane for repairs to its rear and the crash promoted Audi to the first three positions. Pedro Lamy in the No. 50 Larbre Compétition got involved in a battle with Nicolas Armindo's No. 67 IMSA Performance Porsche for the lead of LMGTE Am. Maxime Martin returned OAK's No. 24 Oreca car to the lead in LMP2 until a puncture during his first lap out of the pit lane after a routine stop allowed the No. 48 Murphy Oreca-Nissan vehicle of Hughes back to the front of the category.

Lotterer had an anxious moment when he made a driver error during the first third of a lap in the No. 1 Audi; he returned to the track without losing the overall lead. Further down the field the fuel efficiency of the Ferrari 458 Italia allowed the No. 51 AF Corse of Bruni to remain in contention with the LMGTE Pro leading Corvette of Milner. As it turned 17 June, the No. 48 Murphy Oreca-Nissan relinquished the lead of LMP2 when driver Hughes entered the pit lane with a right-rear puncture that sent the car into a spin at the exit to Arnage corner and caused damage to its rear wheel arch and deck. Pla retook the class lead in the No. 24 OAK Oreca until he too was forced to slow and enter the pit lane with a sudden loss of oil pressure that was unable to be rectified and forced the car's retirement, returning the No. 44 Starworks HPD car of Kimber-Smith and later Dalziel to the category lead. In the eleventh hour, Westbrook had just relieved Milner in the No. 74 Corvette when its left-rear tyre detached in the Dunlop Esses and slowing him for the rest of the lap en route to the pit lane for repairs to the car's bodywork and underwent a change of brake discs. The car relinquished the lead of LMGTE Pro it had held for 66 consecutive laps to the No. 51 AF Corse.

Toyota lost its one remaining entry when the No. 7 car retired after 10½ hours with an engine failure. The No. 74 Corvette emerged on the track soon after though it was once again involved in an incident when Westbrook crashed at the first Mulsanne Straight chicane and necessitating repairs to its bodywork and a change of differential and halfshaft. A major accident for Frankie Montecalvo's No. 58 Luxury Racing Ferrari caused the car to retire with heavy left-hand side damage and its front wing removed. As the race approached half distance, the No. 1 Audi of Fässler led Kristensen's No. 2 car by 40 seconds before a driver change, Bonamoni's No. 3 entry was in third position and the recovering No. 4 driven by Dumas was fourth after contact with the No. 70 Larbre Corvette at the Ford Chicane. Makowiecki lost ground to the LMGTE Pro leading AF Corse Ferrari of Fisichella in the No. 59 Luxury Racing car after a driver error put him into a gravel trap at Indianapolis corner. McNish took over the No. 2 Audi and lapped in the 3 minutes and 30 seconds range to which Fässler's No. 1 entry responded to stabilise a gap to 1 minute and 20 seconds at the conclusion of the 13th hour.

Morning to early afternoon

In the early morning the No. 1 Audi of Fässler spun in the Porsche Curves and made contact with the rear of the car against a barrier, relinquishing first place to McNish's No. 2 car. During this period a broken left-rear transmission on Hartley's No. 48 Murphy Oreca-Nissan failed and caused one of the car's rear wheels to lock before track marshals pushed it towards the pit lane for it to be retired from the event. Abdulaziz Al Faisal spun and crashed backwards against a concrete barrier in the Porsche Curves causing enough damage to retire the vehicle and required the deployment of the safety cars for the second time in the race. When racing resumed Harold Primat's No. 13 Rebellion Lola car spun on cold tyres exiting the Porsche Curves; he avoided contact with a circuit barrier. The car lost a large amount of time while it was recovered by track marshals and Primat continued in sixth overall. The safety cars allowed Lotterer's No. 1 Audi to return to the lead after McNish entered the pit lane for a routine pit stop. Mücke, holding second place in LMGTE Pro, lost control of the No. 97 Aston Martin, went straight on and made contact with the car's right-hand side against a tyre wall to the right of the track. The car sustained minor damage and after repairs which dropped it four laps, returned to the track third in class. AF Corse had their lead in LMGTE Pro further strengthened when Makowiecki's Luxury Racing Ferrari picked up a right-rear puncture and required the team's mechanics to replace it.

Duval in the No. 3 Audi became the lead challenger to the No. 12 Rebellion Lola car, twice resetting the race's fastest lap and passing the Rebellion for fourth overall. Brian Vickers made minor contact against a wall at Tetre Rouge corner and the No. 71 AF Corse Ferrari sustained a left-front puncture. As he entered the pit lane, the front-left wheel caught fire, which fire marshals extinguished. The car was transported into the garage for repairs to its bodywork. Over three hours after reclaiming the race lead, Fässler encountered the No. 74 Corvette, which spun at Mulsanne corner. He damaged the No. 1 Audi's rear bodywork against a barrier in avoidance. Audi told Fässler to remain on the circuit until his next scheduled stop to replace the damaged component. Repairs took more than two minutes to complete and allowed Kristensen's No. 2 car to reclaim the lead following a pit stop for fuel. Kristensen overhauled Fässler in a duel for the lead on the Mulsanne Straight after a driver error sent the latter into a gravel trap. Separate pit stop strategies for the No. 1 and 2 Audi cars saw the lead exchange several times, while the No. 13 Rebellion car was forced into the pit lane for a clutch change and forfeiting sixth place to the No. 22 JRM HPD vehicle. Ayari, driving the No. 49 Pecom Oreca, held second place in LMP2 until he ran wide at Indianapolis corner and beached the car in a gravel trap. The car dropped to fourth after recovery vehicles extricated it from the gravel and Ayari made a pit stop to remove debris from it.

Bonanomi's No. 4 Audi twice stopped on the circuit with a transmission fault that he rectified by resetting the ignition system and kept the car in third position. Not long after an accident for Simon Dolan's No. 38 Jota Zytek in the Porsche Curves caused its retirement in the garage due to extensive damage to its rear. The race-leading No. 1 Audi of Tréluyer spun at the entry to the pit lane as he slowed to comply with the pit lane speed limit. He lost the lead to McNish's No. 2 car who extended it to 47 seconds. Audi suffered two accidents in the 22nd hour that warranted the third deployment of the safety cars. Gené in the No. 3 Audi repeated his co-driver Dumas' accident from the fifth hour, understeering into a wall at the exit to the first Mulsanne Straight chicane and damaged the car's front bodywork and front-right suspension. McNish's No. 2 car had rear oversteer while lapping the No. 59 Luxury Racing Ferrari and punctured a hole on an armco metal barrier in the Porsche Curves. Repairs to the No. 2 Audi dropped McNish one lap behind Lotterer and Gené fell behind the No. 13 Rebellion car in fourth place. After racing resumed, Anthony Pons' No. 76 IMSA Performance Porsche ceded the lead of LMGTE Am to Lamy's No. 50 Larbre Corvette which it maintained to the finish to earn the team's fifth victory in the class after Pons sustained a left-rear puncture on the final lap.

Finish
Audi completed a sweep of the podium positions with the No. 2 and No. 4 cars in second and third. The Audi R18 e-tron quattro was the first hybrid electric and non-permanent four-wheel drivetrain vehicle to win the 24 Hour race. The Starworks Motorsport team was undaunted in LMP2 and maintained the first-place position it had held for 215 consecutive laps to win, earning Kimber-Smith his third victory in the class and Dalziel and Pottolicchio's first. The Thiriet by TDS Racing and Pecom Racing teams were second and third in LMP2. AF Corse held their three-lap lead over Luxury Racing in LMGTE Pro and took their first class win. It gave Bruni his second category win, and Fisichella and Vilander's first. Aston Martin came third in the category. The IMSA Performance team were able to secure a second-place finish in LMGTE Am after the team's late event puncture and the Krohn Racing squad followed in third. There were eighteen outright lead changes amongst three cars during the race. The No. 1 Audi's 326 laps led was more than any other car.

Post-race

The top three teams in each of the four classes appeared on the podium to collect their trophies and spoke to the media in the later press conferences. Lotterer said Audi's victory over Peugeot in the 2011 edition provided him with the confidence to challenge Toyota, "For me, I'm more new in Le Mans so to be in that situation was amazing, so this year we had a bit more confidence within the team. We know we can trust each other even more and this gave us good potential. But you come to Le Mans and you can't expect to win, you just do your best and hope that it will work." McNish apologised for the accident that caused the crew of the No. 2 Audi to lose a chance at victory, "I'm sorry for our team: Dindo, Tom, the engineers and the mechanics. They did a perfect job throughout the race. Despite a few problems we were in contention for victory up to my accident." Capello revealed that he said to McNish that the crash could have occurred to any driver, "For sure I felt disappointed when I saw the car in the wall, but as a driver immediately my thoughts went to Allan because I know he was giving 100% to try to close the gap as much as possible to the #1 car."

Davidson was flown back to his home in Oxford on 20 June to begin a three-month recovery period. He attributed the design of his race seat and head rest to saving him from paralysis, "It held me, supported me and arguably was the thing that saved me from further compression and maybe the worst case scenario of being paralysed now instead. When you look at everything involved, I think I got away with it the lightest I was ever going to." Members of the Toyota team went to the Nissan garage to apologise for the collision that resulted in the retirement of the DeltaWing. The team principal, Pascal Vasselon, stated Toyota's pace in the first half of the race was a realistic of what it could achieve, "We were not looking for an aggressive start and leading for 10 minutes. I know some people were expecting us to try to do that at the start, but no. The drivers knew they had to be safe at the start, then at the beginning the balance was not perfect. It was changing, the track was changing. We started on a very green track [because of the rain overnight] and it's important to be balanced for when the grip builds up, that was our target."

Due to the result of the event, McNish, Kristensen and Capello moved to the lead of the Drivers' Championship with 77 points, 6½ ahead of the race winners Lotterer, Fässler and Tréluyer in second place. Dumas and Duval fell from first to third with 67 points, Gené stood in fourth position with 49 points and the Rebellion trio of Nick Heidfeld, Jani and Nico Prost rounded out the top five with 42½. Audi continued to maintain their lead over the non-scoring Toyota in the Manufacturers' Championship with five races left in the season.

Race classification
Class winners are marked in bold. Cars failing to complete 70 per cent of winner's distance (264 laps) are marked as Not Classified (NC).

Championship standings after the race

 Note: Only the top five positions are included for the Drivers' Championship standings.

References

External links
 

24 Hours of Le Mans races
Le Mans
24 Hours of Le Mans
Le Mans